Bobby McAllister (born January 3, 1966) is a former American football and Canadian football quarterback in the Canadian Football League who played for the Toronto Argonauts and the World League of American Football for the Raleigh-Durham Skyhawks and San Antonio Riders. He played college football for the Michigan State Spartans. attended Blanche Ely High School in Pompano bch, Florida

References

1966 births
Living people
American football quarterbacks
Canadian football quarterbacks
Toronto Argonauts players
Raleigh–Durham Skyhawks players
San Antonio Riders players
Michigan State Spartans football players
People from Pompano Beach, Florida
Place of birth missing (living people)
Players of Canadian football from Florida
Sportspeople from Broward County, Florida